The Killing is an American serial crime drama television series developed by Veena Sud, based on the Danish series of the same name that premiered on AMC on April 3, 2011. The first two seasons center on the homicide of a young girl, Rosie Larsen, and its ensuing consequences on the police force, the suspects, and her distraught family. The third and fourth seasons focus on separate murder investigations. It stars Mireille Enos and Joel Kinnaman as two homicide detectives, as they investigate crimes in Seattle, Washington.

On July 27, 2012, AMC canceled the series after two seasons. However, on January 15, 2013, AMC and Fox Television Studios announced that the series had been renewed for a third season. On September 10, 2013, AMC canceled the series again after three seasons. However, on November 15, 2013, Netflix ordered a fourth and final season of six episodes, which was released on August 1, 2014.

Series overview

Episodes

Season 1 (2011)

Season 2 (2012)

Season 3 (2013)

Season 4 (2014)

Ratings

References

External links
 

 
Lists of American crime drama television series episodes